"Dil Diyan Gallan" is a romantic song from the Hindi feature film Tiger Zinda Hai sung by Atif Aslam. It was composed by Vishal–Shekhar and written by Irshad Kamil.

Release 
The official music video was released on 2 December 2017 by YRF. It has gained over 668 million views on YouTube as of 15 January 2021. The video features Salman Khan and Katrina Kaif, whose characters are in love with each other.

Song credits 
 Song – Dil Diyan Gallan 
 Singer – Atif Aslam 
 Music – Vishal and Shekhar 
 Lyrics – Irshad Kamil

Music video credits 

 Starring – Salman Khan and Katrina Kaif 
 Director – Ali Abbas Zafar 
 Producer – Aditya Chopra 
Film   –    Tiger Zinda Hai
 Music – Vishal – Shekhar 
 Lyrics – Irshad Kamil 
 Director of Photography – Marcin Laskawiec, USC
 Choreography – Vaibhavi Merchant

Reception 
The song is widely popular in South Asia especially in India and Pakistan. It is one of the most streamed songs from a feature film. It is one of the best compositions of Vishal–Shekhar to date.

References 

2017 songs
Atif Aslam songs
Hindi film songs
Songs with music by Vishal–Shekhar
Songs with lyrics by Irshad Kamil